Hervelinghen is a commune in the Pas-de-Calais department in the Hauts-de-France region of France.

Geography

History
Since the time of the English occupation, a long stone mast with a cross on the top has stood in the center of the village.

Today, Hervelinghen is a part of the parish of Notre-Dame-des-Flots. Saint-Inglevert Airfield lies to the east of the village.

Population

Places of interest
 The church of St.Quentin, dating from the seventeenth century.
 Two 18th-century farmhouses.

See also
Communes of the Pas-de-Calais department

References

Communes of Pas-de-Calais
Pale of Calais